And Everything Nice is an American fashion-theme television program broadcast on the now defunct DuMont Television Network. The series ran from 1949 to 1950. The program was hosted by Maxine Barrat (born February 28, 1915), who appeared as herself in MGM's 1943 film Thousands Cheer.

Overview
Barrat chatted with guests and presented fashion tips for women of the 1940s. The program, produced and distributed by DuMont, aired live:
 Tuesdays at 7 pm ET on most DuMont affiliates during the 1948-1949 television season;
 Mondays at 8:30 pm ET in July and August 1949; 
 Mondays at 9 pm ET from September 1949 to January 1950.

The series was cancelled in early 1950, and was one of several low-budget fashion programs, such as Fashions on Parade, broadcast by the DuMont network.

Episode status
A single kinescope of this series survives at the Paley Center for Media in New York City.

See also
List of programs broadcast by the DuMont Television Network
List of surviving DuMont Television Network broadcasts
1949-50 United States network television schedule
Fashions on Parade

References

Bibliography
David Weinstein, The Forgotten Network: DuMont and the Birth of American Television (Philadelphia: Temple University Press, 2004) 
Alex McNeil, Total Television, Fourth edition (New York: Penguin Books, 1980) 
Tim Brooks and Earle Marsh, The Complete Directory to Prime Time Network TV Shows, Third edition (New York: Ballantine Books, 1964)

External links

DuMont historical website

1949 American television series debuts
1950 American television series endings
1940s American documentary television series
1950s American documentary television series
Black-and-white American television shows
DuMont Television Network original programming
English-language television shows
Fashion-themed television series